Periyar Dravidar Kazhagam was a political party in the Indian state of Tamil Nadu. It split from Dravidar Kazhagam in 1996. The president of the party is 'Kolathur' Mani and its general secretary is 'Viduthalai' Rajendran. In August 2012, Periyar Dravidar Kazhagam split into two factions one is Dravidar Viduthalai Kazhagam led by Kolathur Mani and other is Thanthai Periyar Dravidar Kazhagam led by K Ramakrishnan.

References

External links
Official site

Defunct political parties in Tamil Nadu

Periyar E. V. Ramasamy
1996 establishments in Tamil Nadu
Political parties established in 1996
Political parties disestablished in 2012
2012 disestablishments in India